Fowey was a rotten borough in Cornwall which returned two Members of Parliament to the House of Commons in the English and later British Parliament from 1571 to 1832, when it was abolished by the Great Reform Act.

History
The borough consisted of the town of Fowey, a seaport and market town, and the neighbouring hamlet of Mixtow. Unlike many of the most notorious Cornish rotten boroughs which were enfranchised in Tudor times, Fowey had once been a town of reasonable size, and returned members to a national council in 1340, although it had to wait until 1571 for representation in Parliament.

Fowey was a feudal tenure of the Prince of Wales, and by a judgment of 1701 the right to vote was held to rest with "the Prince's tenants", which in practice was interpreted to include all the householders paying scot and lot; there were 331 voters in 1831. However, most of the property in the borough was owned by the Rashleigh family of nearby Menabilly, and in 1816 they and the Earl of Mount Edgcumbe shared the "patronage", each having considerable influence if not quite absolute power to choose one of the MPs.

In 1831, the borough had a population of 1,600, and 340 houses.

Members of Parliament

1571–1629

1640–1832

Notes

References

 Robert Beatson, A Chronological Register of Both Houses of Parliament (London: Longman, Hurst, Res & Orme, 1807) 
 D Brunton & D H Pennington, Members of the Long Parliament (London: George Allen & Unwin, 1954)
 Cobbett's Parliamentary history of England, from the Norman Conquest in 1066 to the year 1803 (London: Thomas Hansard, 1808) 
 Maija Jansson (ed.), Proceedings in Parliament, 1614 (House of Commons) (Philadelphia: American Philosophical Society, 1988)
 J Holladay Philbin, "Parliamentary Representation 1832 – England and Wales" (New Haven: Yale University Press, 1965)
 Henry Stooks Smith, "The Parliaments of England from 1715 to 1847" (2nd edition, edited by FWS Craig – Chichester: Parliamentary Reference Publications, 1973)
 
 

Parliamentary constituencies in Cornwall (historic)
Constituencies of the Parliament of the United Kingdom established in 1572
Constituencies of the Parliament of the United Kingdom disestablished in 1832
Rotten boroughs
Fowey